Pidgin Island is a 1916 American silent romantic drama film directed by Fred J. Balshofer and starring Harold Lockwood, May Allison, Pomeroy Cannon, Lester Cuneo, and Fred L. Wilson. It is based on the 1914 novel of the same name by Harold MacGrath. The film was released by Metro Pictures on December 25, 1916.

Plot

Cast
Harold Lockwood as John Cranford
May Allison as Diana Wynne
Pomeroy Cannon as Michael Smead
Lester Cuneo as Donald Smead
Fred L. Wilson as Uncle Billy
Lillian Hayward as Uncle Billy's wife
Elijah Zerr as Lester
Yukio Aoyama as Wah Sing
Virginia Lee Corbin

Preservation
A print is prepared and preserved by MGM.

References

External links

1916 romantic drama films
American romantic drama films
1916 films
American silent feature films
American black-and-white films
Metro Pictures films
Films based on American novels
Films directed by Fred J. Balshofer
1910s American films
Silent romantic drama films
Silent American drama films